Washington School is a bilingual school (offering both English language and Spanish language) located in Belgrano, Buenos Aires, Argentina, which offers education in both elementary and secondary levels.  The school also offers the International Baccalaureate and AICE programs.

External links 
http://www.washingtonschool.edu.ar/

International schools in Buenos Aires
Secondary schools in Argentina
Cambridge schools in Argentina
Bilingual schools
1950 establishments in Argentina
Educational institutions established in 1950